The European Energy Certificate System (EECS) is a commercially funded, integrated European framework for issuing, holding, transferring and otherwise processing EU energy certificates. It was developed by the Association of Issuing Bodies to provide a properly regulated platform for Renewable Energy Guarantees of Origin, as proposed by the Renewables Directive which supports Directive 2009/72/EC (the Internal Electricity Market Directive). EECS builds upon the concept proposed by the Basic Commitment of the Renewable Energy Certificate System (RECS) and now supports all types of electricity, regardless of source or production technology.

Energy standard 
Highly developed electricity markets make use of certification for Guarantees of Origin (GO) and this is often the case for renewable energy. This certificate includes information about the energy generation attributes of the electricity production to which it relates such as source, capacity, and age of the plant. The certification is particularly important given its utility when complying with a set of green quota and/or to prove that sold or consumed energy did originate from the source indicated in the certificate.

The EECS was developed to serve as the standardization system for the European GOs. It is used by more than 20 countries that are working with the AIB. The organization holds that the certification system is intended to secure "in a manner consistent with European Community law and relevant national laws, that systems operating within the EECS framework are reliable, secure and interoperable." It is claimed that when most stakeholders refer to the GO voluntary market, they are referring to the standardized EECS-GO market.

The scope and focus of EECS now encompasses all forms of electricity, and supports Directive 2012/27/EC (the Energy Efficiency Directive). Work is currently under way to adapt EECS to support forms of energy other than electricity. The EECS Rules set out the energy certificate issuing activities of members of the AIB at an international level; while the implementation of EECS at a national or regional level is set out in a series of Domain Protocols.

References

External links 
 Summaries of EU legislation > Energy

Energy policies and initiatives of the European Union